Lucky Ghost is a 1942 American film directed by William Beaudine. The film is a sequel to the 1941 film Mr. Washington Goes to Town.

The film is also known as Lady Luck (new American title).

Plot
Washington Delaware Jones has never done much good for his town, and ultimately he is ordered by a judge to leave for good. In following the judge's order he brings his friend and collaborator Jefferson, and the two men go on a search for a new place to live.

Both lack professional experience and start thinking about what kind of jobs they might get. Since they both agree on liking food, they decide on becoming food tasters. When they come to the first destination on the road, they pretend to be food inspectors and start stealing chickens from a farm, but the farmer shoots at them. They meet a man of some wealth named Brown, whose car has stopped alongside the road, and his friend Dawson.

While Brown's chauffeur runs along to find gas, the four remaining men start throwing dice. Washington and Jefferson win all the other two have, including the car, and they are driven by the chauffeur to a nearby country club run by Dr. Brutus Blake. Blake is a swindler, and when he sees the two men arrive in their elegant car, he decides to take all they have. Blake arranges a crap game where outcome is fixed to his advantage. Since Blake's partner Blackstone doesn't approve of his tactics, they argue, and Blackstone threaten to reveal to the guests what Blake is up to.

Blake has a thing for the club hostess, and later that night he sees Washington dance with her. He becomes jealous and challenges Washington to a fight. Blake manages to knock himself out during the fight, and when he wakes up he is more determined than ever to take the two guests' money.

Everyone is unaware that the place is haunted by Blake's dead relatives, who are quite disappointed with how Blake has turned out. They also regret leaving the place to him in their wills and send one of them, uncle Ezra Dewey, to set Blake straight.

The gambling begins, and soon Washington and Jefferson have won the whole club from Blake through shooting craps. Ezra finds that the place is just as sinful and decadent under the management of Washington and Jefferson as it was under Blake. The former owners  start scheming to get the place back, and they get the local sheriff to arrest them for made-up criminal offenses.

Ezra finds out about Blake's wicked plans and scares him off. All the ghosts then scare off Washington and Jefferson by haunting the club, and the two men flee for their lives.

Cast 
Mantan Moreland as Washington
F.E. Miller as Jefferson
Maceo Bruce Sheffield as Dr. Brutus Blake
Arthur Ray as Blackstone
Florence O'Brien as Hostess
Harold Garrison as Brown
Jessie Cryer as Dawson
Napoleon Whiting as Chauffeur
Jess Lee Brooks as Door Man
Ida Coffin as Hat Check Girl
Nathan Curry as Farmer
Millie Monroe as First Waitress
Louise Franklin as Second Waitress
Lucille Battle as Third Waitress
Avanelle Harris as Fourth Waitress
Monte Hawley as Masher
Vernon McCalla as First Man Guest
Harry Levette as First Man Diner
Henry Hastings as Uncle Ezra's Ghost
Florence Field as Mrs. Ezra's Ghost
John Lester Johnson as First Ghost
Edward Thompson as Second Ghost
Lester Christmas as Third Ghost
Reginald Fenderson as Dealer

Soundtrack 
Lorenza Flennoy and His Chocolate Drops - "If Anybody Cares" (Written by Don Swander and June Hershey)
Lorenza Flennoy and His Chocolate Drops - "When You Think of Loving, Think of Me" (Written by Don Swander and June Hershey)
Lorenza Flennoy and His Chocolate Drops - "Can't Use It Anymore" (Written by Don Swander and June Hershey)
Lorenza Flennoy and His Chocolate Drops - "Down in Old Darktown"

References

External links 

1942 films
American comedy thriller films
1940s English-language films
American black-and-white films
1942 comedy films
Films directed by William Beaudine
Race films
1940s comedy thriller films
Toddy Pictures Company films
1940s American films